Michel Joseph Archambault (September 27, 1950 – May 23, 2018) was a Canadian ice hockey left winger.

Career
Archambault played in the 1962 Quebec International Pee-Wee Hockey Tournament with his St. Hyancinthe youth team. He began his major junior career with the Quebec Major Junior Hockey League Drummondville Rangers in 1969. He spent most of his career with the Dallas Black Hawks, with one year with the Quebec Nordiques of the World Hockey Association and one year with the Maine Nordiques of the North American Hockey League. He also played three games for the Chicago Black Hawks during the 1976–77 NHL season. Archambault spent one year as an assistant coach for the Saint-Hyacinthe Laser of the Quebec Major Junior Hockey League in the 1990s. He died in 2018 at the age of 67.

References

External links

1950 births
2018 deaths
French Quebecers
Canadian ice hockey left wingers
Chicago Blackhawks draft picks
Chicago Blackhawks players
Drummondville Rangers players
Ice hockey people from Quebec
Maine Nordiques players
People from Saint-Hyacinthe
Quebec Nordiques (WHA) players